Patrick John Field (born 19 March 1959) is a British Circuit judge.

He was educated at Wilmslow County Grammar School and King's College London (LLB). He was called to the bar at Gray's Inn in 1981 and served as a Recorder from 2001 to 2012. Judge Field also serves on the Criminal Procedure Rule Committee

References

1959 births
Living people
Alumni of King's College London
English King's Counsel